Noel is a 2006 Philippine television drama series broadcast by Q. Starring Renz Valerio in the title role, it premiered on April 24, 2006. The series concluded on June 30, 2006 with a total of 50 episodes.

Cast and characters
Lead cast
 Renz Valerio as Noel

Supporting cast
 Gina Alajar
 Jay Aquitania
 Davin Nadal
 James Blanco
 Paolo Contis
 Tanya Garcia
 Pen Medina
 Kurt Perez
 Celia Rodriguez

References

External links
 

2006 Philippine television series debuts
2006 Philippine television series endings
Filipino-language television shows
Philippine drama television series
Q (TV network) original programming
Television shows set in the Philippines